Business Ethics is a 2019 Canadian dark comedy-tragedy drama film following the story of an ambitious businessman who does increasingly callous and illegal things to keep a lucrative Ponzi scheme going. Directed by Nick Wernham, the film features Larenz Tate as main character Zachery Cranston, with Sarah Carter, Julian Richings and Kurtwood Smith in major supporting roles. Gil Bellows, also credited as an executive producer of Business Ethics, plays the minor supporting character Edwin Murk.

Plot
Zachery Cranston, a businessman, is haunted by some unspoken ordeal, despite the beautiful office he finds himself in. He's rude to Veronica, his secretary and mistress, throwing away a present she's left for him. As he contemplates suicide by gun, he reflects back on what led to things all going downhill for him. He looks back to the 1980s, when his beloved mother ran an old-fashioned candy store, in juxtaposition with his sleazy stepfather Edwin Murk, who always taught Zachary that ethics are pointless and that having expensive things is better. Zachary learns business ethics from Professor Wrightway, a wise and moralistic figure who died not long after Zachary graduated. Zachary takes on a job at Murk's own company, where a bespectacled and shy Veronica then works. Murk is hauled away by the police for conducting an elaborate Ponzi scheme. Zachery decides to make his start as a hedge fund manager, trying to get a number of parties, mostly old rich men, onboard with his idea. The only man who shows any interest is Magnus Hardcastle, a wealthy collector and associate of a museum; most of Hardcastle's investments are in bizarre and disturbing things like bull semen, hitman-for-hire companies, and black ops operations. Desperate, Zachery decides to follow in Murk's corrupt footsteps with a Ponzi scheme of his own, deliberately hiring talented but mentally unstable staff who won't rat out his plans. This includes Veronica, who he sees as naive and slow. He also hires a depressed, grieving man named Wilfred as his partner, and Zachary then hires Martin Abacus, a gifted and kind-hearted but severely alcoholic accountant. When Zachery instructs his staff on the Ponzi scheme's dynamics, Wilfred is too confused by the business jargon, Martin's too drunk to care, and Veronica isn't even present. At first, the Ponzi scheme only brings in a few casual investors, including Hardcastle. Other investors who finally kick off the scheme include Hector Angle (an American golf fan), and Mr. Karamazov, a Siberian investor who's implied to be in the mafia. Zachery's increasinly bloated ego distances him from Wilfred and Martin; over the course of 6 years, he finds himself known as one of the most successful hedge fund managers in the world. A few times, he almost slips up and reveals the scheme himself. During a daytime talk show, the hostess asks him a stock market question that he can't answer, and another time, Hardcastle mentions the strange company names under Zachery's fund, most of which relate to teddy bears and kitsch things that only Veronica values, hinting that she made the names up for Zachery as dummy corporations. Zachery buys Murk's old estate, which includes his luxurious homestead and a sprawling field of land with a former farm and a spacious wooded area. He also buys Veronica a present. Veronica, who has a crush on him, hopes it will be something romantic, but it's actually an enormous photo of Zachery himself on the front cover of a financial magazine.

Murk is convicted of fraud. He tells Zachery that he was wrong to let his greed win over his sense of ethics, leaves Zachery with a copy of The Bible as a parting gift, and hangs himself in prison that night. Zachery's aging mother, distraught, has a heart attack and dies while leaving the prison after picking up Murk's belongings. Zachery is thrown into grief to find both his parents dead, speculating that his mother died of a broken heart. Still, he continues with his Ponzi scheme, although he has no closeness to any of his colleagues or investors in the absence of his own family. He discovers, much to his horror, that Martin Abacus has been in rehab, and moreover, that when sober, Martin's now fully aware of the gravity of what he's participated in. Zachery downs a glass of wine, and insists that he get the chance to show Martin around the estate grounds. They walk through the entirety of the large estate and through the woods, but then Zachery shoots Martin in the heart, killing the man before burying him in a shallow grave. The Ponzi scheme continues on, but Zachery realizes that he's no longer finding any thrill or enjoyment in it, or in his money. After scamming a woman, Dr. Helen, when she seeks help in funding a medical project to save lives, he has hallucinations of Professor Wrightway, dressed in a bold purple suit and warning Zachery repeatedly of the legal and financial implications to come if he isn't careful. In Martin Abacus's absence, Zachery pretends that the cocaine addict in a Hawaiian shirt who works with him is in fact the accountant. A police detective suspects that Martin was killed on Zachery's property, and begins bringing in crews of crime scene investigators to search. They find old farm equipment, but no body. Zachery feigns remorse for the disappearance of Martin, but that night, he digs up Martin's body from the grave he'd previously dug, violently dismembering it and dumping the now unidentifiable remains at a hospital disposal incinerator.

Zachery's investors start pulling out, no longer getting the returns they expected, and Zachery's largest investors, who were mostly criminals, are arrested or killed. This leaves Zachery desperate for funds. He learns of some savings bonds kept in a safe deposit box for him in a bank on the island of St. Euripides, and he enlists the little old lady with the key to the deposit box, Mrs. Finnigan, to go with him. They meet up with an old friend, Sartori, who later tries to steal the savings bonds. Unknown to Sartori, Zachery had placed replica savings bonds in the briefcase, all of which were fake; he'd stuffed the real bonds inside his jacket. He brings them home to show Wilfred, but Wilfred tearfully reveals that Zachery's bonds are fakes, as well - they're all in increments of a million dollars, which the United States doesn't do. Zachery is stunned, and realizes that he needs to tell the truth to his only remaining investor, Magnus Hardcastle. Hardcastle is surprisingly forgiving about the whole thing, but he also reveals to Zachery that his investment in fact belonged to the museum organization, and the museum won't be so forgiving about it. Zachery realizes that he'll either go to jail or be bankrupt and penniless if he doesn't do something. He takes Veronica to dinner, buys her a rose, and has sex with her. He then goes back to his old classroom from university, and sits in the empty amphitheater where he once learned business ethics. He realizes, after talking with the ghost of Professor Wrightway, that he's going to have to be honest at some point. He's surprised to find himself emotionless about any regrets he might have had. Martin Abacus's ghost, drenched in blood, appears and asks Zachery if he regrets murdering him. A flashback reveals that Martin had still been alive after being shot, and that Zachery might have been able to save him, but that he'd chosen to shoot him in the head instead, the second bullet killing him rather than the first. Zachery admits that he felt no regrets about taking Martin's life, either. In his office, Zachery contemplates suicide with the gun he used to kill Martin, but Veronica walks in on him. She reveals that a stack of papers that she'd been ordered to label "The Shit Pile" actually had hidden funds in them, enough to pay off Dr. Helen, who'd been asking where the money was to fund her medical device project. Veronica is deeply bothered upon realizing that Zachery was running a Ponzi scheme, and even more bothered that he'd be willing to scam a medical doctor doing life-saving research. She sees that the present she'd given Zachery, a purple teddy bear that he'd complimented her on upon first hiring her, now sits in the garbage can by his desk. Zachery is thrilled by the reveal of the hidden funds, and gets himself dressed up to go meet Hardcastle, indicating that he has no plan for Dr. Helen to get them. He rudely brushes off the dinner date he had with Veronica, and turns to fix himself up in the full-length mirror beside his desk, grinning. Furious, Veronica shoots him in the back, killing him as the screen fades to black.

Cast
Larenz Tate as Zachery Cranston
Sarah Carter as Veronica
Julian Richings as Martin Abacus
Kurtwood Smith as Magnus Hardcastle
Gil Bellows as Edwin Murk
Julian De Zotti as Wilfred
Lance Reddick as Professor Wrightway
Jessica Parker Kennedy as Dr. Helen
Angus Macfadyen as Menlo Sartori
Carolina Bartczak as Amanda Dean
Dorly Jean-Louis as Nellie Cranston
Vitali Makarov as Mr. Karamazov

Production
Business Ethics had originally been made as a short film under the same title, then adapted into a full-length feature film. It was announced in 2016 that Larenz Tate would star as Zachery Cranston, and shooting of the film began in October 2016 in Toronto, Ontario. Actress Carolina Bartczak was originally intended to serve as a more prominent character and direct antagonist, but this was altered at some point during production; Bartczak still retained her role as character Amanda Dean. Actress Sarah Carter was chosen for the lead female character role, Veronica, in September 2016, while Gil Bellows and Julian Richings had already starred as their respective characters in the earlier short film prototype, and thus retained these roles in the feature film.

The film utilized mostly Ontario-based scenery for its backgrounds, while the colour purple was used as a reoccurring motif and symbol for ethical morality, appearing on Professor Wrightway's suit and as the color of the teddy bear plush that Veronica takes with her from her original job. According to Larenz Tate, who had aided in production with his two brothers, the Zachery character was interesting to him because the character defied stereotypes and was a complicated portrayal of a black man in a position of wealth and power: "He [Zachery] uses his intellect. He uses his wisdom. He uses his charisma and, that alone, attracted me to the character because we don’t get a chance to see a lot of Black men or Black folks represented in a very white collar corporate high level position", Tate stated in an interview for Bossip. "It’s some craaaazy stuff that goes on that he’s doing–all the things that when people watch this movie, you begin to question your own morality, would you, if you could, try to scheme really wealthy people. And they’re so disconnected, these wealthy people, some of these wealthy people are so disconnected. You always wonder if you had their money what you would do with it but how do you get to their money? You know, we don’t really get a chance to see those–we’re used to seeing some of the stereotypical things but this is a guy who is super smart and becomes very wealthy."

Distribution
Business Ethics saw a widescale release in October 2020 by distributor Fisher Park Media.

Reception
Business Ethics won Audience Choice Film Award at the 2019 Newark International Film Festival.

References

External links

2019 comedy films
2019 comedy-drama films
2019 black comedy films
2019 drama films
2019 thriller films
2019 crime thriller films
Films about fraud
2010s Canadian films
2010s business films
Films about businesspeople
Films about con artists
Films shot in Toronto
Cultural depictions of fraudsters